Pecoramyces is a genus of anaerobic fungus within phylum Neocallimastigomycota. The genus contains a single species Pecoramyces ruminantium.

References

Monotypic fungi genera
Neocallimastigomycota